State of Change is an original novel written by Christopher Bulis and based on the long-running British science fiction television series Doctor Who. The novel features the Sixth Doctor and Peri, although the dimensional instability of the realm they are currently visiting causes the Doctor to briefly regress through his first five incarnations; the Sixth Doctor also spends a great deal of time allowing the personality of the Third Doctor to take control of his body when he is forced to fight.

Plot
10 BC. The Doctor and Peri land in ancient Rome, specifically in the tomb of Cleopatra. But something is very wrong: The tomb walls depict steam-driven galleys and other disturbing anachronisms. The time travellers discover that Rome has advanced far beyond its natural means, and they must recruit the aid of Ptolemy Caesar to prevent his half-siblings, Alexander Helios and Cleopatra Selene II, from waging a potentially world-ending war with each other. But the anomalies don't just end with Rome, as The Doctor and Peri experience changes of their own...

Continuity
It is implied at the end of the novel, when the Dominion is transported to a newly created duplicate of Earth in a distant star system, that this is the same planet as Mondas - the eventual home of the Cybermen.

External links
The Cloister Library - State of Change
State of Change in the TARDIS Data Core

1994 British novels
1994 science fiction novels
Virgin Missing Adventures
Sixth Doctor novels
Novels by Christopher Bulis
The Rani (Doctor Who) stories
Novels set in ancient Rome
Novels set in the 1st century BC